Bums: An Oral History of the Brooklyn Dodgers is a non-fiction baseball book by Peter Golenbock. It was published in 1984 and won the Casey Award for the best baseball book of the year.

Contents
Bums is a history of the Los Angeles Dodgers ballclub when they were still playing in Brooklyn, NY. It is interspersed with retellings and recollections of former players, club employees, and diehard fans. There is a distinct focus on the 1940s and 1950s era, when the team had its greatest success.

1984 non-fiction books
G. P. Putnam's Sons books
Major League Baseball books
Brooklyn Dodgers
Books about New York City